Margherita Caffi (1650 – 20 September 1710) was an Italian painter of still lifes of flowers and fruit. She was born Margherita Volo, in Milan to Francesco Volo (a still-life painter himself) and his wife, Veronica. In 1668, she married Ludivico Caffi (also a still-life painter) in Cremona. She settled in Piacenza in 1670. She is known to have had at least four children. She died in Milan at the age of  sixty.

References

 

1650 births
1710 deaths
Painters from Cremona
17th-century Italian painters
18th-century Italian painters
Italian Baroque painters
Painters from Milan
Italian women painters
Italian still life painters
Flower artists
17th-century Italian women artists
18th-century Italian women artists